Dimetilan (chemical formula: C10H16N4O3) is a chemical compound used in pesticides.

References

Acetylcholinesterase inhibitors
Pyrazoles
Ureas
Carbamate insecticides